Davis Stone House is a historic home located at Rochester in Ulster County, New York.  It includes the house (c. 1784), small barn (c. 1920), and silo (c. 1920).  The stone house is linear in plan with a perpendicular frame extension off the rear.  The main stone section is one and one half stories, five bays wide with a central entrance, and pent roof.

It was listed on the National Register of Historic Places in 1999.

References

Houses on the National Register of Historic Places in New York (state)
Houses completed in 1784
Houses in Ulster County, New York
National Register of Historic Places in Ulster County, New York